The men's 100 metre freestyle competition of the swimming events at the 2015 World Aquatics Championships was held on 5 August with the heats and the semifinals and 6 August with the final.

Asian Record holder Ning Zetao became the first Chinese male ever to win the 100 meter freestyle at the World Championships.  Coming from second at the halfway turn, Ning beat Australian favorite Cameron McEvoy to win his first ever World Championship medal in 47.84.  McEvoy finished second in a time of 47.95, while Argentina's Federico Grabich emerged as a serious sprint freestyle threat, winning the bronze and his nation's first ever World Championship medal in 48.12.

After leading at the 50 meter mark, Canada's Santo Condorelli faded to fourth in 48.19, while Brazil's Marcelo Chierighini finished fifth in 48.28, beating out hometown favorite Alexander Sukhorukov by a hundredth of a second.  Plagued by a shoulder injury, defending Olympic Champion Nathan Adrian (48.31) tied for seventh with Belgium's Pieter Timmers.

After sustaining a shoulder injury, Australia's James Magnussen was forced to withdraw from the event, leaving him unable to defend his world title.  Russia's Vladimir Morozov, who had the top time in the world coming into the event, left the blocks early in the semifinals, therefore ending his hope of being the first Russian since Alexander Popov to win the coveted 100 meter freestyle at the World Championships.

Records
Prior to the competition, the existing world and championship records were as follows.

Results

Heats
The heats were held at 09:43.

Semifinals
The semifinals were held at 17:32.

Semifinal 1

Semifinal 2

Final
The final was held at 18:05.

References

Men's 100 metre freestyle